State of the Heart is the second studio album by American country music singer-songwriter Mary Chapin Carpenter. It is much more country sounding than her preceding basically folk début Hometown Girl. State of the Heart eventually rose to the No. 28 position on the Billboard Country Albums chart, with four of its tracks finding places within the Hot Country Singles chart. Chronologically, they were "How Do" at No. 19, "Never Had It So Good" at No. 8, "Quittin' Time" at No. 7, and "Something of a Dreamer" at No. 14.

Track listing
All songs written by Mary Chapin Carpenter unless noted.
"How Do" – 2:09
"Something of a Dreamer" – 2:56
"Never Had It So Good" (Carpenter, John Jennings) – 4:04
"Read My Lips" – 3:05
"This Shirt" – 3:48
"Quittin' Time" (Robb Royer, Roger Linn) – 3:52
"Down in Mary's Land" – 2:27
"Goodbye Again" – 4:47
"Too Tired" – 2:28
"Slow Country Dance" – 4:00
"It Don't Bring You" – 4:45

Production
Mary Chapin Carpenter, John Jennings – producers
Bob Dawson – production assistance, recording, mixing
Ted Jensen – mastering

The band
Mary Chapin Carpenter – acoustic guitars, lead & backing vocals
John Jennings – electric & acoustic guitars, synthesizers, backing vocals, bass ("Too Tired"), piano ("This Shirt")
Peter "Tex Luigi" Bonta – accordion, keyboards, acoustic guitar ("How Do")
Jon Carroll – organ, piano, keyboards
Rico Petrucelli – bass, fretless bass
Robbie Magruder – drums, percussion

Additional personnel

Mike Auldridge – dobro, pedal steel ("Slow Country Dance")
Tommy Hannum – pedal steel ("How Do")
Rickie Simpkins – fiddle, mandolin
Shawn Colvin – backing vocals
Kim Miller, David Premo, Bruce Myers, Steven Day – string quartet ("Goodbye Again")
William Zsembery – French horn
Strings written, arranged & conducted by Rico Petrucelli

Charts

Weekly charts

Year-end charts

References

Mary Chapin Carpenter albums
Columbia Records albums
1989 albums